Sendling's Christmas (night) of murder (German:  Sendlinger Mordweihnacht) was a massacre in 1705 in Sendling, 2 km south west of Munich.  An army of peasants, protesting the Austrian regime during the Bavarian People's Uprising, had marched on Munich, but was betrayed from within and massacred. Some 1,100 peasants were killed. 

This event has been a well-known cultural motif in German culture.

Sources
Darwin Porter, Danforth Prince. Frommer's Munich & the Bavarian Alps Volume 349 of Frommer's Complete Frommer's Series.  Frommer's, 2007. ,  

Massacres in Germany
Rebellions in Germany
History of Munich
1705 in the Holy Roman Empire
18th century in Bavaria
Conflicts in 1705
18th century in the Habsburg monarchy